WNRJ is a broadcast radio station carrying a southern gospel format.  WNRJ is licensed to Vienna, West Virginia, serving the Parkersburg, West Virginia and Marietta, Ohio area. WNRJ is known as Praise FM 103.9.

History
WNRJ moved from New Martinsville, West Virginia to Vienna, West Virginia sometime in January 2010. The station can only be heard in New Martinsville via a distant signal, but now serves the Parkersburg/Marietta area.

The station was assigned the WNRJ call letters by the Federal Communications Commission on August 1, 2011.

On January 4, 2017, WNRJ changed their format to Today's Gospel Music playing current and progressive southern gospel, branded as "Praise FM 103.9". Praise FM 103.9 is a Tier One Charting Station for the Singing News Top 80 Monthly Chart - one of eight stations in the United States.

References

External links

Southern Gospel radio stations in the United States
NRJ